Christmas Time Has Come was released on 12 November 2014, and is a Weeping Willows Christmas album.

Track listing
Someday at Christmas
What Can I Give You This Christmas
You're All I Want For Christmas
Pretty Paper
Merry Christmas Baby
First of May
O Holy Night
Midwinter Moon
Winter Night
Purple Snowflakes
Merry Christmas (I Don't Want To Fight Tonight)
Christmas Time Is Here Again
Have Yourself a Merry Little Christmas

Charts

Weekly charts

Year-end charts

References

2014 Christmas albums
Christmas albums by Swedish artists
Weeping Willows albums